SWOT analysis (or SWOT matrix) is a strategic planning and strategic management technique used to help a person or organization identify Strengths, Weaknesses, Opportunities, and Threats related to business competition or project planning. It is sometimes called situational assessment or situational analysis. Additional acronyms using the same components include TOWS and WOTS-UP.

This technique is designed for use in the preliminary stages of decision-making processes and can be used as a tool for evaluation of the strategic position of organizations of many kinds (for-profit enterprises, local and national governments, NGOs, etc.). It is intended to identify the internal and external factors that are favorable and unfavorable to achieving the objectives of the venture or project. Users of a SWOT analysis often ask and answer questions to generate meaningful information for each category to make the tool useful and identify their competitive advantage. SWOT has been described as a tried-and-true tool of strategic analysis, but has also been criticized for its limitations, and alternatives have been developed.

Overview 
The name is an acronym for the four components the technique examines:

 : characteristics of the business or project that give it an advantage over others
 : characteristics that place the business or project at a disadvantage relative to others
 : elements in the environment that the business or project could exploit to its advantage
 : elements in the environment that could cause trouble for the business or project

Results of the assessment are often presented in the form of a matrix, or simply as paragraphs.

Internal and external factors 
Strengths and weaknesses are usually considered internal, while opportunities and threats are usually considered external. The degree to which the internal strengths of the firm matches with the external opportunities is expressed by the concept of strategic fit.

Internal factors are viewed as strengths or weaknesses depending upon their effect on the organization's objectives. What may represent strengths with respect to one objective may be weaknesses (distractions, competition) for another objective. The factors may include personnel, finance, manufacturing capabilities, and all of the marketing mix's 4Ps.

External factors include macroeconomics, technological change, legislation, and sociocultural changes, as well as changes in the marketplace.

A number of authors advocate assessing external factors before internal factors.

Use 
SWOT analysis has been used at different levels of analysis in many arenas, not just in profit-seeking organizations. Examples include non-profit organizations, governmental units, and individuals. SWOT analysis may also be used in pre-crisis planning and preventive crisis management. SWOT analysis may also be used in creating a recommendation during a viability study/survey.

Subscription databases that are available in many libraries, such as Business Source Elite and Gale Business Insights, regularly produce new SWOT analyses of companies.

Strategy building 
SWOT analysis can be used to build organizational or personal strategy. Steps necessary to execute strategy-oriented analysis involve identification of internal and external factors (often using the popular 2 × 2 matrix), selection and evaluation of the most important factors, and identification of relations existing between internal and external features.

For instance, strong relations between strengths and opportunities can suggest good conditions in the company and allow using an  strategy. On the other hand, strong interactions between weaknesses and threats could be analyzed as a potential warning and advice for using a  strategy.

One form of TOWS matrix combines each of the four components with another to examine four distinct strategies:
 WT strategy (mini–mini): Faced with external threats and internal weaknesses, how to minimize both weaknesses and threats?
 WO strategy (mini–maxi): Faced with external opportunities and internal weaknesses, how to minimize weaknesses and maximize opportunities?
 ST strategy (maxi–mini): Faced with external threats and internal strengths, how to minimize threats and maximize strengths?
 SO strategy (maxi–maxi): Faced with external opportunities and internal strengths, how to maximize both opportunities and strengths?

Matching and converting 
One way of using SWOT is matching and converting. Matching is used to find competitive advantage by matching the strengths to opportunities. Another tactic is to convert weaknesses or threats into strengths or opportunities. An example of a conversion strategy is to find new markets. If the threats or weaknesses cannot be converted, a company should try to minimize or avoid them.

Corporate planning 

As part of the development of strategies and plans to enable an organization to achieve its objectives, that organization will use a systematic/rigorous process known as corporate planning. SWOT alongside PEST/PESTLE can be used as a basis for the analysis of internal and environmental factors.

Corporate planning includes steps such as:
 Setting objectives—defining what the organization is going to do
 Environmental scanning
 Internal appraisals of the organization—an assessment of the present situation as well as a portfolio of products/services and an analysis of the product/service lifecycle
 Analysis of existing strategies—this should determine relevance from the results of an internal/external appraisal, and may include gap analysis of environmental factors
 Defining strategic issues—key factors in the development of a corporate plan that the organization must address
 Developing new/revised strategies—revised analysis of strategic issues may mean the objectives need to change
 Establishing critical success factors—the achievement of objectives and strategy implementation
 Preparation of operational, resource, and projects plans for strategy implementation
 Monitoring all results—mapping against plans, taking corrective action, which may mean amending objectives/strategies

Marketing 

In competitor analysis, marketers build detailed profiles of each competitor in the market, focusing especially on their relative competitive strengths and weaknesses using SWOT analysis. Marketing managers will examine each competitor's cost structure, sources of profits, resources and competencies, competitive positioning and product differentiation, degree of vertical integration, historical responses to industry developments, and other factors.

Marketing management often finds it necessary to invest in research to collect the data required to perform accurate marketing analysis. Accordingly, management often conducts market research (alternately marketing research) to obtain this information. Marketers employ a variety of techniques to conduct market research, but some of the more common include:
 Qualitative marketing research such as focus groups
 Quantitative marketing research such as statistical surveys
 Experimental techniques such as test markets
 Observational techniques such as ethnographic (on-site) observation

Marketing managers may also design and oversee various environmental scanning and competitive intelligence processes to help identify trends and inform the company's marketing analysis.

Below is an example SWOT analysis of a market position of a small management consultancy with a specialism in human resource management (HRM).

In community organizations 

The SWOT analysis has been used in community work as a tool to identify positive and negative factors within organizations, communities, and the broader society that promote or inhibit successful implementation of social services and social change efforts. It is used as a preliminary resource, assessing strengths, weaknesses, opportunities, and threats in a community served by a nonprofit or community organization.

 (internal factors within an organization):
 Human resources—staff, volunteers, board members, target population
 Physical resources—the organization's location, building, equipment
 Financial—grants, funding agencies, other sources of income
 Activities and processes—programs delivered, systems employed
 Past experiences—building blocks for learning and success, the organization's reputation in the community

 (external factors stemming from community or societal forces):
 Future trends in the organization's field or the society
 The economy—local, national, or international
 Funding sources—foundations, donors, legislatures
 Demographics—changes in the age, race, gender, culture of those in the organization's service area
 Physical environment—Is the building in a growing part of town? Is the bus company cutting routes?
 Legislation—Do new government requirements make the work harder or easier?
 Local, national, or international events

Although the SWOT analysis was originally designed as an organizational method for business and industries, it has been replicated in community work as a tool for identifying external and internal support to combat the internal and external opposition. Understanding the particular community can be helped via public forums, listening campaigns, and informational interviews and other data collection. The SWOT analysis provides direction to the next stages of the change process. It has been used by community organizers and community members to further social justice in the context of social work practice.

Limitations and alternatives
SWOT analysis is intended as a starting point for discussion and cannot, in itself, show managers how to achieve a competitive advantage, particularly in a rapidly changing environment.

In a highly cited 1997 critique, "SWOT Analysis: It's Time for a Product Recall", Terry Hill and Roy Westbrook observed that one among many problems of SWOT analysis as it is often practiced is that "no-one subsequently used the outputs [of SWOT analysis] within the later stages of the strategy". Hill and Westbrook, among others, also criticized hastily designed SWOT lists. Other examples of potential pitfalls in practice are: preoccupation with a single strength, such as cost control, leading to a neglect of weaknesses, such as product quality; and domination by one or two team members doing the SWOT analysis and devaluing possibly important contributions of other team members. Many other limitations have been identified.

Michael Porter developed the five forces framework as a reaction to SWOT, which he found lacking in rigor and too .

Business professors have suggested various ways to remedy the common problems and limitations of SWOT analysis while retaining the SWOT framework.

SOAR 
SOAR (strengths, opportunities, aspirations, and results) is an alternative technique inspired by appreciative inquiry. SOAR has been criticized as having similar limitations as SWOT, such as "the inability to identify the necessary data".

SVOR 
In project management, the alternative to SWOT known by the acronym SVOR (Strengths, Vulnerabilities, Opportunities, and Risks) compares the project elements along two axes: internal and external, and positive and negative. It takes into account the mathematical link that exists between these various elements, considering also the role of infrastructures. The SVOR table provides an intricate understanding of the elements hypothesized to be at play in a given project:

Constraints consist of: calendar of tasks and activities, costs, and norms of quality. The "k" constant varies with each project (for example, it may be valued at 1.3).

History 
In 1965, three colleagues at the Long Range Planning Service of Stanford Research Institute—Robert F. Stewart, Otis J. Benepe, and Arnold Mitchell—wrote a technical report titled Formal Planning: The Staff Planner's Role at Start-Up. The report described how a person in the role of a company's staff planner would gather information from managers assessing operational issues grouped into four components represented by the acronym SOFT: the "satisfactory" in present operations, "opportunities" in future operations, "faults" in present operations, and "threats" to future operations.

Also in 1965, four colleagues at the Harvard Graduate School of Business Administration—Edmund P. Learned, C. Roland Christensen, Kenneth R. Andrews, and William D. Guth—published the first of many editions of the textbook Business Policy: Text and Cases. ( was a term then current for what has come to be called strategic management.) The first chapter of the textbook stated, without using the acronym, the four components of SWOT and their division into internal and external appraisal:

Looking back from three decades later, in the book Strategy Safari (1998), management scholar Henry Mintzberg and colleagues said that Business Policy: Text and Cases "quickly became the most popular classroom book in the field", widely diffusing its authors' ideas, which Mintzberg et al. called the "design school" model (in contrast to nine other schools that they identified) of strategic management, "with its famous notion of SWOT" emphasizing assessment of a company's internal and external situations. However, the textbook contains neither a 2 × 2 SWOT matrix nor any detailed procedure for doing a SWOT assessment. Strategy Safari and other books identified Kenneth R. Andrews as the co-author of Business Policy: Text and Cases who was responsible for writing the theoretical part of the book containing the SWOT components. More generally, Mintzberg et al. attributed some conceptual influences on what they called the "design school" (of which they were strongly critical) to earlier books by Philip Selznick (Leadership in Administration, 1957) and Alfred D. Chandler Jr. (Strategy and Structure, 1962), with other possible influences going back to the McKinsey consulting firm in the 1930s.

By the end of the 1960s, the four components of SWOT (without using the acronym) had appeared in other publications on strategic planning by various authors, and by 1972 the acronym had appeared in the title of a journal article by Norman Stait, a management consultant at the British firm Urwick, Orr and Partners. By 1973, the acronym was well-known enough that accountant William W. Fea, in a published lecture, mentioned "the mnemonic, familiar to students, of S.W.O.T., namely strengths, weaknesses, opportunities, threats". An early example of a 2 × 2 SWOT matrix is found in a 1980 article by management professor Igor Ansoff (but Ansoff used the acronym T/O/S/W instead of SWOT).

In popular culture
 Television: In the 2015 Silicon Valley episode "Homicide" (Season 2, Episode 6), Jared Dunn (Zach Woods) introduces the Pied Piper team to SWOT analysis. Later in that episode Dinesh (Kumail Nanjiani) and Gilfoyle (Martin Starr) employ the method when deciding whether or not to inform a stunt driver that the calculations for his upcoming jump were performed incorrectly.

See also 
 Benchmarking
 Enterprise planning systems
 Porter's four corners model
 Problem structuring methods
 Program evaluation and review technique (PERT)
 Semiotic square (Greimas square)
 Situation analysis
 Six forces model
 SWOQe
 VRIO (Value, Rarity, Imitability, Organization)

References

Further reading 
SWOT analysis is described in very many publications. A few examples of books that describe SWOT analysis and are widely held by WorldCat member libraries and available in the Internet Archive are:

External links 
 

Business intelligence terms
Strategic management
Management theory